Miles Lake is a  long glacial lake in the U.S. state of Alaska. It is located in the valley of the Copper River, which pools to create it.

Etymology 
Name derived from Miles Glacier, which was named in 1885 by Lt. Allen after Maj. Gen. Nelson A. Miles, 1839–1925.

References

See also
 List of lakes of Alaska

Lakes of Alaska
Lakes of Chugach Census Area, Alaska